Sigurd Richard Engelbrekt Wallén (1 September 188420 March 1947) was a Swedish actor, film director, and singer.

Selected filmography

 His Lordship's Last Will (1919)
 Andersson's Kalle (1922)
 New Pranks of Andersson's Kalle (1923)
 The Suitor from the Highway (1923)
 The Counts at Svansta (1924)
 Her Little Majesty (1925)
 The Million Dollars (1926)
 Uncle Frans (1926)
 The Queen of Pellagonia (1927)
 Jansson's Temptation (1928)
 Frida's Songs (1930)
 Skipper's Love (1931)
 Colourful Pages (1931)
 The Red Day (1932)
 His Life's Match (1932)
 The Storholmen Brothers (1932)
 Love and Deficit (1932)
 Servant's Entrance (1932)
 Black Roses (1932)
 Lucky Devils (1932)
 Marriageable Daughters (1933)
 Boman's Boy (1933)
 Andersson's Kalle (1934)
 The Count of the Old Town (1935)
 Swedenhielms (1935)
 The People of Småland (1935)
 Shipwrecked Max (1936)
 Conscientious Objector Adolf (1936)
 Adolf Strongarm (1937)
 John Ericsson, Victor of Hampton Roads (1937)
 Conflict (1937)
 The Andersson Family (1937)
 A Woman's Face (1938)
 Mot nya tider (1939)
 June Nights (1940)
 A Crime (1940)
 A Real Man (1940)
 With Open Arms (1940)
 Life Goes On (1941)
 The Poor Millionaire (1941)
 It Is My Music (1942)
 Night in Port (1943)
 In Darkest Smaland (1943)
 Imprisoned Women (1943)
 The People of Hemsö (1944)
 Skipper Jansson (1944)
Widower Jarl (1945)
 Crime and Punishment (1945)
 When the Meadows Blossom (1946)

References

External links

Swedish comedians
Swedish male film actors
Swedish male silent film actors
20th-century Swedish male actors
Swedish film directors
1884 births
1947 deaths
20th-century Swedish comedians